Roderrick Justin "Rod" Ferrell (born March 28, 1980) is an American murderer and cult leader. He was a member of a loose-knit gang of teenagers from Murray, Kentucky, known as the "Vampire Clan". Ferrell claimed to be a 500-year-old vampire named Vesago, a character he created for himself after becoming obsessed with the role playing game Vampire: The Masquerade. It was his mother, Sondra Gibson who first introduced this game to Rod. In 1998, Ferrell pleaded guilty to the double slaying of a couple from Eustis, Florida, becoming the youngest person in Florida on Death Row at that time. Originally sentenced to death, Ferrell's penalty has since been reduced to life imprisonment.

The killings
On November 25, 1996, Naomi Ruth Queen and Richard Wendorf were found by their daughter Jennifer Wendorf, beaten to death in their Eustis home.  While 49-year-old Richard Wendorf was asleep on his couch and Ruth was in the shower, Ferrell and accomplice Howard Scott Anderson had entered the home through the unlocked garage, picking up the murder weapon, a crowbar. 

Before Richard had even awakened, Ferrell beat him multiple times with it, fracturing both his skull and ribs, almost instantly knocking him out, and killing him shortly thereafter. When Ruth had found Ferrell and Anderson in the home moments later, Ferrell bludgeoned her to death, bashing her head with the crowbar. He claimed in his confession, however, that in his original plan he was going to allow Naomi Ruth to live, but she first attacked him by lunging at him and throwing a very hot cup of coffee on him, which angered him and made him change his mind and so he killed her also. 

Richard had burn marks in the shape of a V. It was said that the V was Ferrell's symbol, which he accompanied with a dot for each person he considered to be in his vampire cult.

The victims were the parents of Heather Wendorf, a long-time friend of Rod's whom he was helping to run away from a home that she described as "hell". Heather and the other girls that were with Ferrell and Anderson were not at the Wendorf home when the murders took place. Charity Keesee and her friend Dana Cooper had driven Heather to her boyfriend's apartment so Heather could say good-bye before leaving for New Orleans, leaving Roderrick and Scott outside the Wendorf home.

After four days of driving through four states, the group was found in Baton Rouge, Louisiana.  It is believed that Ferrell liked a video arcade in New Orleans, and they were headed there. One of the girls, Charity Keesee, placed a call to her grandmother in South Dakota. The group needed money, and Charity thought her grandmother could help them. However, Keesee's grandmother informed the police about her whereabouts and helped them trick Ferrell, Wendorf, and the rest of the teens into going to a local Howard Johnson's hotel, where they were arrested by waiting law enforcement. The four were held at a Baton Rouge jail for a week before being extradited back to Florida, where they were initially booked at the Lake County Jail. They were later moved to a juvenile facility in Ocala.

Legal proceedings
On February 12, 1998, then-seventeen-year-old Ferrell pleaded guilty to the murders, claiming that the others traveling with him were innocent except Scott Anderson, who was simply an accessory. Ferrell pleaded guilty to two counts of felony murder. 

Ferrell's attorneys tried to argue that he was insane; he has been diagnosed with mental disorders including schizotypal personality disorder and Asperger syndrome. The University of Florida further attested that Rod could sometimes witness spiritual things, like angels and demons.

Judge Jerry T. Lockett sentenced Ferrell to death. Charity Keesee was convicted of two counts of third-degree murder, robbery with a gun or deadly weapon and burglary armed with a weapon or explosives. She was sentenced to 10.5 years in state prison. Dana Cooper was convicted of those charges as well, but was given a 17.5 year prison sentence. Anderson was convicted of the same charges as Ferrell and was sentenced to life in prison. 

For two years, Ferrell held the record as the youngest inmate on death row until November 2000, when the Florida Supreme Court reduced his sentence to life in prison. Because Florida had long abolished parole, the sentence is without it. Keesee was released from prison in March 2006 and Cooper was released from prison in October 2011.

In January 2013, an appellate court dismissed attempts by Roderrick Ferrell and Howard Scott Anderson to get a new sentencing hearing. However, in December 2018, Howard Scott Anderson was resentenced by circuit judge Don Briggs to 40 years in prison. Anderson was given credit for the 22 years he has already served with him first being eligible for release in 2031. 

Ruth Wendorf's relatives attended Anderson's re-sentencing hearing and did not oppose his early release. Speaking with the Daily Commercial, they said they are more concerned about Ferrell who was scheduled to face his own re-sentencing hearing in July 2019. Ferrell's resentencing hearing was then moved to November 18 and then again to April 2020 and the sentencing judge upheld his life without parole sentence and deemed him irreparably corrupt. 

Anderson is currently incarcerated in the Calhoun Correctional Institution while Ferrell is currently incarcerated in the Northwest Florida Reception Center Annex.

In the media

 1998 Anglia Television TV crime documentary "Kentucky Teenage Vampires" is about Ferrell and his clan
 2002 film Vampire Clan is based on and named after Ferrell's cult
 2003 Legendary Shack Shakers song "Blood on the Bluegrass" is about Ferrell and his clan
 2020 The UnXplained with William Shatner is a documentary series which includes an episode about Ferrell in its first season

See also
 List of United States death row inmates

References

Sources
 "Vampire cult town shrinks under national spotlight", Lubbock Avalanche-Journal / Associated Press.  December 2, 1996.
 Hallifax, Jackie.  "Death sentence for cult leader reduced", Sun Sentinel.  November 10, 2000. 
 Florida v. Rod Ferrell - "The Vampire Cult Slaying Case", Court TV.  June 22, 2001.
 Jones, Aphrodite.  The Embrace: A True Vampire Story.  June 1, 2000.  .
 Seigenthaler, John.  MSNBC Investigates, MSNBC.  October 26, 2002.
 "The Vampire Clan" profile provided by sacrosanctum.org

External links

 Rod Ferrell's confession
 Serial Killer Central
 Inmate profile on the Florida Department of Corrections.

1980 births
Living people
American people convicted of burglary
American people convicted of murder
American prisoners sentenced to life imprisonment
American prisoners sentenced to death
Crimes involving Satanism or the occult
Criminals from Kentucky
Minors convicted of murder
People from Murray, Kentucky
Prisoners sentenced to life imprisonment by Florida
Prisoners sentenced to death by Florida
People with Asperger syndrome
People with schizotypal personality disorder
Vampirism (crime)
People convicted of murder by Florida
Cult leaders